Knuffle Bunny: A Cautionary Tale ( pronounced k-nuffle) is an award-winning, classic children's picture book written and illustrated by Mo Willems. Released by Hyperion Books in 2004, Knuffle Bunny received the 2005 Caldecott Honor.  The story spawned an animated short film and a musical play, as well as two sequels. The Knuffle Bunny Series has sold more than 750,000 copies. The series' protagonist, Trixie, is named after Willems's real-life child.

Plot
Trixie Willems steps lively as she and her father, Mo Willems, walk down the block, through the park, past the school, to the laundromat. For the toddler, loading and putting money into the machine evokes wide-eyed pleasure. But on the return home, she realizes that her stuffed rabbit, Knuffle Bunny, has been left behind. Because she cannot talk, Trixie cannot explain to Mo why she is upset. Despite his plea of, "Now, please don't get fussy," she gives it her all, bawling and going "boneless." They both arrive home unhappy. Cheryl, Trixie's mother, immediately understands that Knuffle Bunny is missing. The three run back to the laundromat, and after several tries, Mo finds the toy among the wet laundry, and claims hero status. The toddler exuberantly exclaims, "Knuffle Bunny!!!" — her first words.

Reception
Kirkus Reviews wrote, "The natural audience for this offering is a little older than its main character: they will easily identify with Trixie’s grief and at the same time feel superior to her hapless parent—and rejoice wholeheartedly at the happy reunion." Publishers Weekly asserted that Willems "creates an entertaining story for parents and children alike." and "once again demonstrates his keen insight with a story both witty and wise." Common Sense Media described it as "a charming book for all ages," and Inis magazine of Children's Books Ireland wrote, "Mo Willems’s book has a unique style that draws you in."

In other media 
The story's audio version, narrated by Mo, Cheryl, and Trixie Willems, won the 2007 Audie Award for Children's Titles for Ages up to 8. It also spawned an animated short, which won the Carnegie Medal for Excellence in Children's Video in 2007. The book was also adapted into a musical, Knuffle Bunny: A Cautionary Musical, by Willems, Michael Silversher, and Deborah Wicks La Puma. It toured with the Kennedy Center to cities all across the United States.

A Knuffle Bunny stuffed toy was released by the Yottoy Productions.

In 2019, the Park Slope branch of the Brooklyn Public Library unveiled a statue of Knuffle Bunny. Park Slope was chosen because it is the setting of the books and was the home of the author at the time of their writing. 

The story is read on an episode of the PBS children's show Between the Lions.

Sequels 
In August 2007, a sequel, Knuffle Bunny Too: A Case of Mistaken Identity was published. The sequel picks up with the original book's main character, Trixie, three years later. In September 2010, Knuffle Bunny Free: An Unexpected Diversion was released, completing the trilogy. The final installment features an epilogue in which Willems sends a poignant message to his real daughter, Trixie, wishing her well in her life as an adult.

References

2004 children's books
American picture books
Children's fiction books
Caldecott Honor-winning works
Books about rabbits and hares
Children's books adapted into films